Amajlija or Željko Joksimović is the name of the debut studio album by Serbian singer and songwriter Željko Joksimović.

Track listing

"7 Godina" (Željko Joksimović, Leontina) 2:41
"Amajlija" (Joksimović, Dragan Brajović) 3:25
"Habanera" (Joksimović, Svetlana Slavković) 4:44
"Pesma Sirena" (Joksimović, Slavković) 4:10
"Samo Ti" (Joksimović, Brajović) 3:28
"Ne Dam Nikom Da Te Dira" (Joksimović, Dejan Ivanović) 3:32
"Još Ne Sviće Rujna Zora" (trad.) 4:51
"9 Dana" (Leontina) 3:37

Personnel
Željko Joksimović: Vocals, Accordion, Keyboards, Programming, Percussion
Leontina Vukomanović, Gordana Svilarević, Svetlana Palada, Svetlana Slavković, Romana Panić: Backing vocals
Ivana Ćosić: Female Vocals on track 7
Andrej Budimlić, Nebojša Zulfikarpašić – Keba: Guitars
Branko Kljajić: Guitars, Tambura (Prim and alto)
Vlada Baralić: Pipe
Ivan Code: Keyboards, Drum and rhythm programming

References

1999 debut albums
Željko Joksimović albums